Stacy William Kohut (born October 15, 1970) is a Canadian Paralympic skier. He has a gold and three silver medals.

References
 

Alpine skiers at the 1994 Winter Paralympics
Alpine skiers at the 1998 Winter Paralympics
Alpine skiers at the 2002 Winter Paralympics
Paralympic gold medalists for Canada
Paralympic silver medalists for Canada
Living people
1970 births
Canadian male alpine skiers
Skiers from Calgary
Medalists at the 1994 Winter Paralympics
Medalists at the 1998 Winter Paralympics
Paralympic medalists in alpine skiing
Paralympic alpine skiers of Canada